"Cheyenne" is a popular and sentimental song written in 1906, with words by Harry Williams and music by Egbert Van Alstyne. It became a hit for a number of artists. The chorus is:

Other uses
The song became a staple of the underscore of western films, to the point of being stereotyped. It also lent itself well to parody.

In the 1943 cartoon "Yankee Doodle Daffy", Daffy Duck puts on a cowboy hat and rides Porky Pig like a horse, as the exasperated pig is trying to get rid of and away from the annoying duck, who sings these not-overly-clever lyrics to the same tune:

At the time the song was first popular, scandals about conditions in meat-packing plants were in the news. Billy Murray, who had also recorded a "straight" version of the song, recorded a biting parody about a diseased horse that was targeted for such a plant. The chorus:

References

Bibliography
Williams, Harry; Van Alstyne, Egbert. "Cheyenne" (sheet music). New York: Jerome H. Remick & Co. (1906).

External links
Billy Murray's recording of the original song (1906)
Billy Murray parody version

Songs about cowboys and cowgirls
1906 songs
American popular music
Western music (North America)
Songs with music by Egbert Van Alstyne
Songs with lyrics by Harry Williams (songwriter)